Rafael Elias da Silva (born 4 December 1999), known as Rafael Elias or Papagaio, is a Brazilian footballer who plays as a forward for Baniyas, on loan from Palmeiras.

Career statistics

References

External links

1999 births
Living people
Brazilian footballers
Association football forwards
Campeonato Brasileiro Série A players
Sociedade Esportiva Palmeiras players
Clube Atlético Mineiro players
Goiás Esporte Clube players
Cuiabá Esporte Clube players
Ituano FC players
Brazil youth international footballers
Brazil under-20 international footballers
Footballers from São Paulo